Voivodeship road 114 (abbreviated DW 114) is a route in the Polish voivodeship roads network. The route links Nowe Warpno with the Voivodeship Road 115 in Tanowo.

Route plan

References

114